Natale da chef is a 2017 Italian comedy film directed by Neri Parenti.

Cast
Massimo Boldi as Gualtiero Saporito
Biagio Izzo as Tony Cacace
Dario Bandiera as Filippo Tosti
Rocío Muñoz Morales as Perla
Enzo Salvi as Mario Linatucci
Paolo Conticini as Felice Becco
Maurizio Casagrande as Furio Galli
Milena Vukotic as Lina Renghi
Fabrizio Buompastore as Nicola
Francesca Chillemi as Laura Micheletti
Barbara Foria as Beata
Loredana De Nardis as Caterina
Sylvia Panacione as Flavia
Jacopo Sarno as Lorenzo
Massimo De Lorenzo as Gentiletti
Rishad Noorani as Chatu

See also
 List of Christmas films

References

External links

2017 films
Films directed by Neri Parenti
Films scored by Bruno Zambrini
2010s Italian-language films
2017 comedy films
2010s Christmas comedy films
Italian Christmas comedy films
2010s Italian films